A  is the Japanese iteration of a single-portion take-out or home-packed meal, often for lunch. Outside Japan, it is common in other East and Southeast Asian culinary styles, especially within Chinese, Korean, Singaporean, Taiwanese cuisines and more, as rice is a common staple food in the region. The term bento is derived from the Chinese term biandang, which means "convenient" or "convenience".

A traditional bento may contain rice or noodles with fish or meat, often with pickled and cooked vegetables in a box. Containers range from mass-produced disposables to hand-crafted lacquerware. Often various dividers are used to separate ingredients or dishes, especially those with strong flavors, to avoid them affecting the taste of the rest of the meal. A typical divider is green plastic grass, also known as the 'sushi grass'. This also works to slow the growth of bacteria.

Bento are readily available in many places throughout Japan, including convenience stores, railway stations, and department stores. However, Japanese homemakers often spend time and energy on carefully prepared box lunches for their spouses, children, or themselves. Outside Japan, the term bento box may be used (e.g., on English menus for Japanese restaurants). Bentos can be elaborately arranged in a style called "kyaraben" ("character bento"), which are typically decorated to look like popular characters from Japanese animation (anime), comic books (manga), or video games. Another popular bento style is "oekakiben" or "picture bento". This is decorated to look like people, animals, buildings and monuments or items such as flowers and plants. Contests are often held where bento arrangers compete for the most aesthetically attractive arrangements.

There are comparable forms of boxed lunches in other Asian countries such as in China, Taiwan and other Sinophone communities as biàndāng in Mandarin and piān-tong in Taiwanese Hokkien or in Korea as dosirak. Other Asian countries would either just use bento as a loanword or hokben, which means steaming bento. There has also been discussion regarding what the bento means for Japanese society and what it represents. The analyses range from a simple semiotic approach to one that outlines the deeper ideological meanings behind the bento.

Etymology
In Japan, "bento" is written in the Kanji . The word itself originates from the Chinese Song Dynasty slang term , meaning "convenient" or "convenience" (This sense is still used in Wu dialects such as Shanghainese). The word "bento" has been used since the 13th century, and the container itself, also called "bento", has been known since the 16th century. In modern times, the term is commonly used in East and Southeast Asia. In mainland China, Hong Kong and Taiwan, "bento" remains written as the original name . In other Sinophone communities, both biandang and bento are often interchangeably used.

History
Hoshi-ii can be eaten as is or boiled with water to make cooked rice, and is stored in a small bag. By the 16th century, wooden lacquered boxes were produced, and bento would be eaten during a hanami or a tea party.

In the Edo period (1603–1867), bento culture spread and became more refined. Travelers and sightseers would carry a simple koshibentō ("waist bento"), consisting of several onigiri wrapped with bamboo leaves or in a woven bamboo box. One of the most popular styles of bento, called makuno-uchi bentō ("between-act bento"), was first made during this period. People who came to see Noh and Kabuki ate specially prepared bentos between maku (acts).  Numerous cookbooks were published detailing how to cook, how to pack, and what to prepare for occasions like hanami and Hinamatsuri.

There are several records that claim where ekiben was first sold, but it is believed that it was sold on 16 July 1885, at the Utsunomiya train station, in the northern Kantō region of Japan, and contained two onigiri and a serving of takuan (pickled radish) wrapped in bamboo leaves. As early schools did not provide lunch, students and teachers carried bentos, as did many employees.

In the Taishō period (1912–1926), the aluminum bento box became a luxury item because of its ease of cleaning and its silver-like appearance. Also, a move to abolish the practice of bento in school became a social issue. Disparities in wealth spread during this period after an export boom during World War I and subsequent crop failures in the Tohoku region. A bento too often reflected a student's wealth, and many wondered if this had an unfavorable influence on children both physically, from lack of adequate diet, and psychologically, from a clumsily made bento or the richness of food. After World War II, the practice of bringing bentos to school gradually declined and was replaced by uniform food provided for all students and teachers.

Bentos regained popularity in the 1980s, with the help of the microwave oven and the proliferation of convenience stores. In addition, the expensive wood and metal boxes have been replaced at most bento shops with inexpensive, disposable polystyrene boxes. However, even handmade bentos have made a comeback, and they are once again a common, although not universal, sight at Japanese schools. Bentos are still used by workers as a packed lunch, by families on day trips, as well as for school picnics and sports days. The bento, made at home, is wrapped in a furoshiki cloth, which acts as both bag and table mat.

The trends in Japanese bento 
a bento has seen a variety of random trends in Japan. Often, these trends lead to remarkable transformations in the consumption behavior of the Japanese.The following are examples of some of the trends in Japanese bento and their timeline.

Kyaraben (2000s - present) - cute bento shaped like characters.

High-quality nori bento (2010s - present) - Luxurious bento made with high-grade nori seaweed.

Single-serving size bento (2010s-present) - Large bento for large appetites.

Taco Rice Bento (2010s-present) - Bento featuring taco rice, a local dish of Okinawa Prefecture.

Frugal bento (2020s-present) - Bento boxes that are simple and unique are becoming popular.

In other countries

Taiwan 
The bento made its way to Taiwan in the first half of the 20th century during the Japanese colonial period and remains popular to the present day. The Japanese name was borrowed as bendong  (Taiwanese Hokkien: piān-tong) or (Mandarin: biàndāng) Taiwanese bento always includes protein, such as a crispy fried chicken leg, a piece of grilled mackerel and marinated pork chop, as well as the side dishes. Taiwan Railway Bento is a well known bento manufactured and distributed by the Taiwan Railways Administration at major railway stations and in train cars. It is estimated that, with five million boxed meals sold per year, the annual revenue from bento distribution is 370 million NTD (approx. 10 million USD).

Korea 
In Korea, the packed lunch boxes are called Dosirak (also spelled "doshirak") and they are either made at home or bought at the store. They are similar to Chinese and Japanese variations with some slight differences. Korean bento boxes are usually made with a few different vegetable and meat side dishes. The special ingredient is Kimchi which adds the Korean element to the bento box.

Singapore 
In Singapore, such packed lunch boxes are often acculturated and localised with cuisines slightly different to Japan. These may include roasted pork (similar to char siew) and soy eggs, as well as fried rice. It has been a common method of meal preparation within Singaporean cuisine as early as the start of the 20th century, which was intensified during the Japanese occupation and cultural influences in subsequent decades, with Japanese-style bento also being common in the country today.

In 2021, the Singapore Food Tech Event showcased as to how bento of the future might look like for a sustainable food system.

Culture
In Japan, it is common for mothers to make bento for their children to take to school. Because making bento can take a while, some mothers will prepare the ingredients the night before, and then assemble and pack everything the following morning before their children go to school. It is often a social expectation of mothers to provide bento for their children, to create both a nutritionally balanced and aesthetically pleasing meal. This activity is expected of the mother and emphasized by society at large, and is common in nursery school institutions.

The traditional bento that is eaten at school or at work is most often prepared by the mother or the wife. However, it can also be bought in konbini (mini-markets) or from street vendors who appear on street corners at lunchtime. For those in a hurry who have to spend their lunch time aboard the shinkansen (bullet train), there is also the bento ekiben which, as its name suggests, is on sale in the train stations. Bento is also present in more solemn moments, even on the Japanese New Year's table for example. Then called osechi, it comes in two or three levels and contains expensive dishes that are eaten at this high point of the Japanese calendar.

Scholarship 
Many scholars have written about the bento since the late 20th century. The foundation of their approach is based on the idea that food can carry many different meanings.

In the 1970’s, Chie Nakane used the ekiben, a specific type of bento sold in train stations, as a metaphor for group organization in Japan. By comparing this variant of bento to groups in Japan, he considered how different organizations in Japanese society often include identical components so it does not depend on any other groups for its success. For O-Young Lee in 1984, the bento is utilized to present the reductionism tendencies of Japanese culture. All the food in this Japanese style lunch box is only able to be reduced to fit in a little box due to it being Japanese food; it naturally lends itself to being tightly packed. Roland Barthes, on the other hand, used a symbolic approach to describe the lack of a centerpiece in Japanese food. He described the distinct contents of a bento box as a multitude of fragments or ornaments that are thrown together to beautify each other. Joseph Jay Tobin in 1992 discussed how the meticulous assembly of individual bentos has been aided by the reinterpretation of Western goods, practices, and ideas through a process he classified as domestication.

Types

By ingredients
 Hinomaru bento is the name for a bento consisting of plain white rice with an umeboshi in the centre. The name was taken from the Hinomaru, the Japanese flag, which has a white background with a red disc in the centre. Pure Hinomaru bento only consists of rice and umeboshi to flavor rice without any other side dishes. The metal bento boxes, once popular in Japan, were often corroded by the acid of umeboshi, eventually making a hole in the middle of the lid.
 Noriben is nori dipped in soy sauce covering cooked rice.
 Sake bentō is a simple bento with a slice of broiled salmon as the main dish.
 Tori bento consists of pieces of chicken cooked in sauce served over rice.  It is a popular bento in Gunma Prefecture.

By style or container
 Kamameshi bentō are sold at train stations in Nagano Prefecture. It is cooked and served in a clay pot. The pot is a souvenir item.
 Kyaraben (キャラ弁) is a bento with the contents arranged to look like popular characters from anime, manga, or video games.
 Makunouchi bentō is a classic style of bento with rice, umeboshi, a slice of broiled salmon, and a rolled egg.
 Shōkadō bentō is a traditional black-lacquered bento box. It inspired IBM's (later sold to Lenovo) ThinkPad design.
 Wappameshi a cuisine served in a special round wooden bento-styled container.

By where they are sold
 Ekiben is a bento sold at railway stations (eki) or onboard trains.  There are many kinds of ekiben. Most are inexpensive and filling.
 Hokaben is any kind of bento bought at a take-out bento shops. Freshly cooked hot (hokahoka) rice is usually served with freshly prepared side dishes. The name was popularized after a pioneering take-out bento franchise in the field, Hokka Hokka Tei.
 Shidashi bentō is made in a restaurant and delivered during lunch. This bento is often eaten at a gathering like a funeral or a party.  It is usually packed with traditional Japanese foods like tempura, rice and pickled vegetables.  A shidashi bento packed with European-style food is also available.
 Soraben is a bento sold at airports.

Bento-related slang
 Hayaben, literally "early bento", is eating a bento before lunch and having another lunch afterward.
 Shikaeshiben (仕返し弁) is a "revenge" bento where wives make bentos to get back at their husband by writing insults in the food or making the bento inedible.

Gallery

See also
 Jūbako and sagejū : traditional containers of bento, typically lacquerware
 Plate lunch : a Hawaiian street food
 Tiffin carrier : an Indian lunchbox
 TV dinner : a western prepackaged frozen meal

References

Sources

External links

 Photos of bento on Flickr

 
Food combinations
Food storage containers
Japanese cuisine terms
Meals
Serving and dining